Christopher Butler  (7 May 1902 – 20 September 1986), born Basil Butler, was a convert from the Church of England to the Roman Catholic Church, a Bishop, a scholar, and a Benedictine Monk.

After his Solemn Profession as a Monk and his Ordination as a Roman Catholic priest, he became the 7th Abbot of Downside Abbey, the Abbot President of the English Benedictine Congregation, an auxiliary bishop of Westminster, an internationally respected scripture scholar, a consistent defender of the priority of the Gospel according to Matthew, and the pre-eminent English-speaking Council Father at the Second Vatican Council (1962–65).

Religious life
In 1928, after an illustrious career as undergraduate at the University of Oxford and a year teaching at Brighton College, Butler, baptized in the Church of England, was received into full communion with the Roman Catholic Church. The next year, he became a monk of the Benedictine community of Downside Abbey, a House of the English Benedictine Congregation, and was ordained priest there in 1933. In 1946 the community elected him as their Abbot, which he remained for twenty years until his consecration in 1966 as Titular Bishop of Nova Barbara and Auxiliary Bishop to Cardinal John Carmel Heenan in the Archdiocese of Westminster.

Scholarly career
Butler's wide-reaching interests and competence included theology, spirituality, contemplative prayer, ecumenism, the Church Fathers and the dialogue with contemporaries such as Bernard Lonergan. He wrote The Church and Infallibility: A Reply to the Abridged 'Salmon''', in response to George Salmon's criticism of papal infallibility and the infallibility of the Church.

Defending, like his predecessor Abbot John Chapman and his fellow-monks, Dom Bernard Orchard and Dom Gregory Murray ,the traditionally-maintained priority of the Gospel according to Matthew, Butler published a critique of the two-document hypothesis and a study of the indebtedness of the Gospel according to Luke to the Gospel according to Matthew (cf. Synoptic Problem).

Role at Vatican II
It was in his capacity as Abbot President (1961–66) of the English Benedictine Congregation and as an outstanding scripture scholar, that Butler was called to Rome to participate in Vatican II (1962–1965). He was one of maybe two dozen "men who made the Council", contributing, often in fluent Latin, to many of the council's documents, e.g. The Dogmatic Constitution on Divine Revelation (Dei verbum) which he regarded as their very underpinning, and subsequently was a strong proponent of the teachings of Vatican II.

Publications
Butler was a prolific writer, a bibliography of his books, articles and reviews running to some 337 titles. He was a popular guest on the BBC's radio programmes.Flood, Anne T., SC, B.C. Butler's developing understanding of church. An intellectual biography. Thesis-Phil. D. (Religion). Washington, D.C., Catholic University of America, 1981. (iv, 294 leaves). Bibliography at leaves 250-90.

References

External links
Photograph dating from the 1920s.
Photograph with Pope Paul VI, 1965.
Photograph of Bishop  Butler in his late years.
Hierarchy
Vatican II - Voice of The Church
Bibliography of Butler's writings and list of his guest appearances on BBC radio
B.C. Butler’s developing understanding of church. An intellectual biography. By Anne T. Flood

Further reading
Aidan Bellenger, 'Butler, Basil Edward [Christopher Butler] (1902–1986)', in Oxford Dictionary of National Biography'' (Oxford University Press, 2004)

1902 births
1986 deaths
20th-century Roman Catholic bishops in England
Abbots of Downside
Benedictine bishops
Converts to Roman Catholicism from Anglicanism
English Benedictines
Participants in the Second Vatican Council
People educated at Reading School
Place of death missing